Anna Malenfant (October 16, 1902 – June 15, 1988) was a Canadian singer, educator and composer.

Early years and career

She was born in Shediac, New Brunswick. Malenfant began her career with a performance of The Mikadoin Moncton. She received a bursary that allowed her to study at the New England Conservatory of Music; she went on to study with Félia Litvinne in Paris and with Massimiliano Perilli in Naples. On her return to North America in 1929, she sang on radio station WITC in Hartford, Connecticut for a year under the name Louise Malmont. She studied with Salvator Issaurel in Montreal from 1930 to 1939. In 1932, with Ludovic Huot and Lionel Daunais, she founded the Trio lyrique. She performed with the Société des concerts symphoniques de Montréa (later the Montreal Symphony Orchestra). Malenfant performed in a number of operas, including Carmen, Werther and Boris Godunov. After 1944, she mainly performed in recitals and also taught. In 1958, she received a Canada Council grant which allowed her to further develop her vocal technique in Rome. She composed several songs published under the name Marie Lebrun which were inspired by the area where she was born in New Brunswick.

Death

Malenfant died in Montreal at the age of 82.

Legacy

École Anna-Malenfant in Dieppe, New Brunswick was named in her honour.

In 2001, a documentary Anna Malenfant d'Acadie was produced based on archival material.

References 

1902 births
1988 deaths
Canadian contraltos
20th-century Canadian women opera singers
Canadian music educators
Acadian people
Women music educators
Canadian women composers